Sinezona globosa is a species of minute sea snail, a marine gastropod mollusk or micromollusk in the family Scissurellidae, the little slit shells.

Description
The length of the shell attains 3.1 mm.

Distribution
This marine species occurs off New Caledonia.

References

 Geiger D.L. (2006). Eight new species of Scissurellidae and Anatomidae (Mollusca: Gastropoda: Vetigastropoda) from around the world, with discussion of two senior synonyms. Zootaxa 1128:1–33.
  Geiger D.L. (2012) Monograph of the little slit shells. Volume 1. Introduction, Scissurellidae. pp. 1–728. Volume 2. Anatomidae, Larocheidae, Depressizonidae, Sutilizonidae, Temnocinclidae. pp. 729–1291. Santa Barbara Museum of Natural History Monographs Number 7

Scissurellidae
Gastropods described in 2006